The year 1899 in science involved some significant events, listed below.

Astronomy
 December 2 – During the new moon, a near-grand conjunction of the classical planets and several binocular Solar System bodies occur. The Sun, Moon, Mercury, Mars and Saturn are all within 15° of each other, with Venus 5° ahead of this conjunction and Jupiter 15° behind. Accompanying the classical planets in this grand conjunction are Uranus (technically visible unaided in pollution-free skies), Ceres and Pallas.
 The 80 cm refracting telescope is completed at Potsdam Observatory.

Biology
 May 1 – The National Trust in the United Kingdom acquires its first part of Wicken Fen, making it the country's oldest wetland nature reserve.
 November 8 – The New York Zoological Society opens the Bronx Zoological Park to the public in New York City under the direction of William Temple Hornaday.

Chemistry
 Actinium is discovered by André-Louis Debierne.
 International Committee on Atomic Weights established.

Exploration
 January 23 – The British Southern Cross Expedition crosses the Antarctic Circle. Later in the year, it first charts Duke of York Island.

Mathematics
 Élie Cartan first defines the exterior derivative in its modern form.
 David Hilbert publishes Grundlagen der Geometrie, proposing a formal set, Hilbert's axioms, to replace Euclid's elements.
 Georg Alexander Pick publishes his theorem on the area of simple polygons.

Medicine
 Bubonic plague enters Brazil through the seaport of Santos.
 March 6 – Felix Hoffmann patents Aspirin and Bayer registers its name as a trademark.
 October 2 – The London School of Hygiene & Tropical Medicine is established by Patrick Manson at the Albert Dock Seamen's Hospital.

Physics
 May 8 - Ernest Rutherford publishes his discovery of two different types of radiation, alpha rays and beta rays.
 Henri Becquerel discovers that radiation from uranium consists of charged particles and can be deflected by magnetic fields.
 Hertha Ayrton becomes the first woman to read her own paper (on the electric arc) before the Institution of Electrical Engineers in London, of which soon afterwards she is elected the first female member.

Psychology
 Sigmund Freud's Die Traumdeutung (The Interpretation of Dreams) is published (dated 1900).

Technology
 February 14 – Voting machines are approved by the U.S. Congress for use in federal elections.
 March 22 – London inventor Edward Raymond Turner applies for a patent for his additive colour process for colour motion picture film.
 The first modern step-type escalator is designed by Charles Seeberger in the United States.
 Hugo Lenz first demonstrates Lenz poppet valve gear, for stationary steam engines.
 The world's first successful self-propelled steam fire engine, the 'Fire King', is built by Merryweather & Sons in London and dispatched to Port Louis on Mauritius.

Awards
 Copley Medal: Lord Rayleigh
 Wollaston Medal for Geology: Charles Lapworth

Births
 January 12 – Paul Hermann Müller (died 1965), Swiss chemist, winner of the Nobel Prize in Physiology or Medicine in 1948.
 February 27 – Charles Best (died 1978), American-born medical scientist.
 April 11 – Percy Lavon Julian (died 1975), African American research chemist.
 April 28 – Mary Loveless, née Hewitt (died 1991), American immunologist.
 May 8 – Charles Illingworth (died 1991), English surgeon.
 May 14 – Charlotte Auerbach (died 1994), German-Jewish Scottish geneticist and zoologist.
 July 3 – Ludwig Guttmann (died 1980), German-born neurologist and pioneer of paralympic games.
 July 7 – Anna Baetjer (died 1984), American toxicologist.
 July 26 – Bill Hamilton (died 1978), New Zealand mechanical engineer.
 September 3 – Frank Macfarlane Burnet (died 1985), Australian virologist best known for his contributions to immunology, winner of the Nobel Prize in Physiology or Medicine in 1960.
 September 29 – László Bíró (died 1985), Hungarian inventor.
 October 5 – Elda Emma Anderson (died 1961), American nuclear and health physicist.
 October 18 – Janet Vaughan (died 1993), English physiologist.
 October 27 – Nikolay Dollezhal (died 2000), a key figure in Soviet atomic bomb project and chief designer of nuclear reactors.
 November 10 – Helen Porter (died 1987), English plant physiologist.

Deaths
 January 4 – Henry Alleyne Nicholson (born 1844), British palaeontologist and zoologist.
 February 18 – Sophus Lie (born 1842), Norwegian mathematician.
 March 18 – Othniel Charles Marsh (born 1831), American paleontologist.
 July 16 – Margaretta Riley (born 1804), British botanist.
 August 9 – Edward Frankland (born 1825), English chemist.
 August 16 – Robert Bunsen (born 1811), German chemist, perfector of the bunsen burner.
 October 28 – Ottmar Mergenthaler (born 1854), German American inventor.

References

 
19th century in science
1890s in science